The High Rock Range is a mountain range of the Canadian Rockies in southwestern Alberta and southeastern British Columbia, Canada.

It is a part of the Southern Continental Ranges and is located on the Continental Divide, north of the Crowsnest Pass and south of the Highwood Pass. It lies partly within Kananaskis Country.

The Misty Range and the Greenhills Range are subdivisions of the High Rock.

Peaks and mountains
Mount Rae - 
Mist Mountain - 
Tornado Mountain - 
Courcelette Peak - 
Mount Lyall - 
Beehive Mountain - 
Mount Armstrong - 
Crowsnest Mountain - 2785 m (9137 ft)
Mount Muir - 
Allison Peak - 
Mount Tecumseh -

See also
 Ranges of the Canadian Rockies

References

Mountain ranges of Alberta
Mountain ranges of British Columbia
Ranges of the Canadian Rockies